Josef Fuchs may refer to:

 Josef Fuchs (athlete) (born 1935), Austrian Paralympic athlete
 Josef Fuchs (cyclist) (born 1948), Swiss racing cyclist
 Josef Fuchs (theologian) (1912–2005), German Roman Catholic theologian and Jesuit priest

See also
Joseph Fuchs (1899–1997), American violinist and teacher
Joseph Fuchs (1814–1888), French illustrator
Fuchs (disambiguation)